"Gypsy Road" is a single released by American glam metal band Cinderella from their second album Long Cold Winter in 1988.

Charts

References

1988 songs
1989 songs
Cinderella (band) songs
Mercury Records singles
Songs written by Tom Keifer
Southern rock songs